Fool Bar is the third studio album by Dutch singer-songwriter Douwe Bob. It was released in the Netherlands on 6 May 2016, through Universal Music Group. The album peaked at number 2 on the Dutch Albums Chart. The album includes the single "Slow Down", the song represented the Netherlands in the Eurovision Song Contest 2016. The album was produced by Matthijs van Duijvenbode and Kasper Frenkel.

Reception

Commercial performance
On 14 May 2016 the album debuted at number 4 on the Dutch Albums Chart in its first week of release, later peaking at number 2.

Singles
"Slow Down" was released as the lead single from the album on 5 March 2016. Douwe Bob was announced as the Dutch entrant to the Eurovision Song Contest 2016 by Dutch media on 20 September 2015. Two days later, he confirmed the news during the Dutch talk show De Wereld Draait Door. The song was revealed as his Eurovision entry on 4 March 2016 during a press conference in Amsterdam. He performed in the first half of the semi-final. He got through the semi-final and performed in the Final on 14 May 2016, coming in 11th place with 153 points.

Track listing

Chart performance

Weekly charts

Year-end charts

Release history

References

2016 albums
Douwe Bob albums